Scaliolidae, common name scaliolids, is a family of minute sea snails, marine gastropod molluscs or micromollusks in the superfamily Cerithioidea, the ceriths and their allies.

Sand grains agglutinate to the teleoconch in the type genus Scaliola.

2005 taxonomy 
According to the taxonomy of the Gastropoda by Bouchet & Rocroi (2005) the family Scaliolidae has no subfamilies and has Obtortionidae Thiele, 1925 and Finellidae Thile, 1929 as its synonyms.

2006 taxonomy 
Bandel (2006) classified Scaliolidae within the superfamily Cerithioidea, but Obtortionidae at its own family level and Finellidae as a subfamily of Bittiidae.

Genera 
Genera within the family Scaliolidae include:
 Finella A. Adams, 1860 - synonyms: Eufenella Kuroda & Habe, 1952; Fenella A. Adams, 1864; Obtortio Hedley, 1899
 Scaliola A. Adams, 1860 - type genus of the family Scaliolidae

References

Further reading 
 Ponder W. F. (1994). "The anatomy and relationships of Finella and Scaliola (Caenogastropoda: Cerithioidea: Scaliolidae)". In: Morton B. (ed.) The malacofauna of Hong Kong and Southern China III, pp. 215–241, Hong Kong University Press.

External links 
 Photos at the Natural HIstory Museum Rotterdam website